The Gwa'Sala-Nakwaxda'xw Nations are a union of two Kwakwaka'wakw peoples in a band government based on northern Vancouver Island in British Columbia, Canada, whose main reserve community is near the town of Port Hardy in the Queen Charlotte Strait region of the Central Coast region of British Columbia, Canada.  The band government is a member of the Kwakiutl District Council and, for treaty negotiation purposes, the Winalagalis Treaty Group which includes three other members of the Kwakiutl District Council (the Quatsino First Nation, the Da'naxda'xw Awaetlatla Nation, and the Tlatlasikwala Nation).

The Gwa'sala-'Nakwaxda'xw Nation was originally two distinct First Nations, the Gwa'sala and the 'Nak'waxda'xw (Nakoaktok). In the mid-1960s the Federal Government relocated the two nations to the current reserve, Tsulquate, and amalgamated them (along with the neighbouring Kwakiutl First Nation) into one group. Eventually the Gwa'sala-'Nakwaxda'xw Nations and the Kwakiutl First Nation separated into the two groups that are recognized by the federal government to this day.  Their current main community is at Tsulquate IR No. 4 near Port Hardy.

First Nations reserves
First Nations reserves under the governance of the Gwa'Sala-'Nakwaxda'xw are:
Ann Island IR No. 7, on Ann Island in Smith Sound, 10.10 ha. 
Dedagaus IR No. 8, on the north shore of Seymour Inlet, 1/2 mile north of the Nahwokto Rapids, 0.30 ha. 
Halowis IR No. 5, at the mouth of Smokehouse Creek at the head of Long Lake, 3.60 ha. 
Kai-too-kwis IR No. 15, at the head of Chief Nollis Bay on Allison Sound, north of Belize Inlet, 20.80 ha. 
Kequesta IR No. 1, on the north shore of the entrance to Nuget Sound, 70.40 ha. 
Khazisela IR No. 7,on an island in the centre of the Nahkwocto Raids at the north end of Schooner Channel, 0.40 ha. 
Ko-kwi-iss IR No. 14, on the east shore of Allison Sound to the north of Belize Inlet, 6.40 ha. 
Kuthlo IR No. 18, at the head of Salmon Arm of Seymour Inlet, 3.0 ha. 
Kwetahkis IR No. 9, on the north shore of Whelakis Lagoon on Seymour Inlet, 4.0 ha. 
Mahpahkum IR No. 4, on Deserters Island in the Deserters Group, and including small off-shore islands, 7.80 ha. 
Na-kwockto IR No. 2, on three small islands at the mouth of Nugent Sound, 1/2 mile south of Kequesta IR No. 1, 0.40 ha.  
Nathlegalis IR No. 3, comprising Indian Island and five smaller islands in Takush Harbour in Browning Channel, 134.40 ha. 
Nekite IR No. 2, at the mouth of the Nekite River at the head of Smith Inlet, 66.80 ha.  
Owh-wis-too-a-wan IR No. 10, at Eclipse Narrows at the mouth of Frederick Sound, Seymour Inlet, 5.30 ha. 
Pahas IR No. 3, on the north shore of Blunden Harbour, 39.90 ha. 
Pel-looth'l Kai IR No. 17, at the east end of Belize Inlet, 1.70 ha. 
Peneece IR No. 11, at the head of Wigwam Bay on the north shore of Seymour Inlet, 3.50 ha. 
Saagoombahlah IR No. 6, on the east shore of Schooner Passage east of Braham Island, 1.80 ha. 
Ta-a-ack IR No. 5, on one of the islands in the Storm Islands at the west end of Queen Charlotte Strait, 13.90 ha. 
Toksee IR No. 4, at the junction of Long Lake and Wyclees Lagoon, 5.60 ha. 
Tsai-kwi-ee IR No. 13, at Village Bay on the east shore of Mereworth Sound, 4.60 ha. 
Tseetsum-Sawlasilah IR No. 6, on the north shore of Naysash Inlet, Smith Sound, 2.10 ha. 
Tsulquate IR No. 4, on the west shore of Hardy Bay, one mile north of Port Hardy, 59.90 ha. 
Waump IR No. 16, at the head of Allison Sound, Belize Inlet, 37.60 ha. 
Wawwat'l IR No 12, on the right bank of the Seymour River, two miles from the head of Seymour Inlet, 66.80 ha. 
Wyclese IR No. 1, on the south shore of Smith Sound at the entrance to Wyclees Lagoon, 223 ha.

See also
Kwak'wala (language)

References

External links
BC Treaty.net information page

Kwakwaka'wakw governments
Central Coast of British Columbia